Norman Jones (15 January 1930 – 23 March 1999) was an Australian boxer. He competed in the men's light welterweight event at the 1952 Summer Olympics.

References

1930 births
1999 deaths
Australian male boxers
Olympic boxers of Australia
Boxers at the 1952 Summer Olympics
Place of birth missing
Light-welterweight boxers